The Shanghai Japanese School (SJS) is a Japanese international school serving primary and junior high school levels in Shanghai. It has two campuses, one in Hongqiao and one in Pudong. The school's teachers are Japanese citizens. The school also has a senior high school component.

History
In April 1987, the school was founded as The Japanese Government General Consulate of Shanghai, Shanghai Japanese School. The school has since changed its name to the current Shanghai Japanese School.

The high school opened in 2011 (Heisei 23).

Campuses

The SJS Senior High School is located on the Pudong campus.

See also
 Japanese community of Shanghai

Mainland China-aligned Chinese international schools in Japan:
 Kobe Chinese School
 Yokohama Yamate Chinese School

References

Further reading

 Gokami, Tetsuo (後上 鐵夫 Gokami Tetsuo; 国立特殊教育総合研究所教育相談部) and Michiyo Kobayashi (小林 倫代 Kobayashi Michiyo; 国立特殊教育総合研究所教育相談部). "上海日本人学校,北京日本人学校における特別支援教育の実情と教育相談支援" (Archive). 世界の特殊教育 21, 47-50, 2007-03. National Institute of Special Needs Education (独立行政法人国立特別支援教育総合研究所). See profile at CiNii.
 瀧田 透 (前上海日本人学校浦東校:福島県南会津郡南会津町立田島第二小学校). "上海日本人学校浦東校 社会科副読本の作成(国際理解教育・現地理解教育)." 在外教育施設における指導実践記録 33, 134-136, 2010-12-24. Tokyo Gakugei University. See profile at CiNii.
 安保 尚子. "上海日本人学校高等部 : 設立の背景・意図と現状 (特集 これからの海外・帰国子女教育 : グローバル人材育成が望まれる時代)." グローバル経営 (354), 12-15, 2011-12. 日本在外企業協会. See profile at CiNii.
 岡安 明久 (前上海日本人学校虹橋校:埼玉県比企郡川島町立中山小学校). "上海日本人学校虹橋校での勤務を通して : 世界一活気のある街,上海 (第3章 教科外指導)." 在外教育施設における指導実践記録 32, 51-54, 2009-10-12. Tokyo Gakugei University. See profile at CiNii.
 齊藤 悦代 (前上海日本人学校浦東校:北海道上川郡上川町立上川中学校). "上海日本人学校浦東校における国際理解教育の実践 (第5章 国際理解教育・現地理解教育)." 在外教育施設における指導実践記録 32, 90-93, 2009-10-12. Tokyo Gakugei University. See profile at CiNii.
 宇野 篤史 (前上海日本人学校浦東校:兵庫県神戸市立魚崎小学校). "上海日本人学校浦東校の概要と特色ある教育活動 (第9章 その他)." 在外教育施設における指導実践記録 32, 167-170, 2009-10-12. Tokyo Gakugei University. See profile at CiNii.
 常陽銀行上海駐在員事務所. "中國街角事情(第46回)上海日本人学校(小学校)事情." Joyo ARC 41(481), 34-37, 2009-11. 常陽地域研究センター. See profile at CiNii.
 古谷 寿之. "揚子江便り(74)奮闘する上海日本人学校." 中国経済 (467), 70-73, 2004-12. 日本貿易振興機構. See profile at CiNii.
 伊予銀行上海駐在員事務所. "上海便り 上海日本人学校で学ぶ子供たち." IRC調査月報 (181), 42-44, 2003-07. いよぎん地域経済研究センタ-. See profile at CiNii.
 信太 謙三. "ワールド・ナウ 国際化の波に揺れる上海日本人学校." 世界週報 83(37), 54-55, 2002-10-01. 時事通信社. See profile at CiNii.
 熊谷 高弘 (前上海日本人学校教諭・大分県玖珠町立玖珠中学校教諭). "上海日本人学校における総合的な学習 : 上海の活力に負けない児童・生徒の育成." 在外教育施設における指導実践記録 25, 31-34, 2002. Tokyo Gakugei University. See profile at CiNii.
 小島 勝. "上海日本人学校の今昔 (特集 上海--未来と過去の交錯する都市) -- (オールド上海と日本人)." Intriguing Asia (アジア遊学) (33), 112-119, 2001-11. 勉誠出版. See profile at CiNii.

External links

 Shanghai Japanese School  (srx2.net.cn)
 Shanghai Japanese School  (ja-school.com)
 "探访在上海开设的首个日本人学校高中部" (Archive). China News Service (CNS) at Chinanews.com (中国新闻网). May 17, 2011. 

International schools in Shanghai
Shanghai
Schools in Pudong